Chechelivskyi District is an urban district of the city of Dnipro, in southern Ukraine. It is located in the city's center on the southwestern outskirts and the right-bank of the Dnieper River.

History

The district was known as the 5th court district of Yekaterinoslav (Dnipro's former name) when it was first created on 1 December 1897. After the 1905 revolution, the district was renamed into the Zavodskyi District and in 1917 the Brianskyi District after the same Briansk Factory (today, Petrovsky Metallurgical Factory).

From 1920 to 1923 the district was named the Fabrychno-Chechelivskyi District. In 1923 its name was changed again, this time to the Chechelivskyi District. In 1925 it became known as the Krasnohvardiiskyi District.

In 1963 the eastern portions of the district were annexed to the newly formed Zhovtnevyi District. In 1973 some additional territories of the Zhovtnevyi and Krasnohvardiiskyi districts were also annexed to the newly formed Babushkinskyi District.

November 26, 2015 the order of Acting Mayor within to comply with decommunisation Krasnohvardiiskyi District was renamed to Chechelivskyi. It is now named after , the commanding officer of the Baturyn garrison during the reign of Ivan Mazepa as Hetman of Zaporizhian Host.

Neighborhoods
 Chechelivka
 Shlyakhivka
 Krasnopillia
 Shevchenko
 Verkhniy

Gallery

References

External links

  at the Dnipro City Council website 

Urban districts of Dnipro
States and territories established in 1897
1897 establishments in Ukraine
1897 establishments in the Russian Empire